Route 203 is a  east-west state highway located wholly within the city of Boston, Massachusetts. The western terminus is at Centre Street (formerly U.S. Route 1) in Jamaica Plain and the eastern terminus is at the Southeast Expressway (Interstate 93 / US 1 / Route 3) and Route 3A in Neponset. Route 203 is poorly signed, but runs along part of the Arborway, Morton Street and Gallivan Boulevard, all parkways formerly part of the Metropolitan District Commission system of parks and roads.

Maintenance

Prior to the creation of the Massachusetts Department of Transportation (MassDOT) in 2009, the route was owned and maintained by the Department of Conservation and Recreation (DCR, previously the Metropolitan District Commission). On November 1, 2009, the Msgr. William Casey Highway overpass in Jamaica Plain, Morton Street in Mattapan and Gallivan Boulevard in Dorchester were transferred to MassDOT, while the Arborway continues to be maintained under the DCR.

History

Route 203 was designated in the early 1970s as part of a large Boston-area renumbering. Most of the route had been part of Route 3, which came south along the Jamaicaway with US 1 and split to the east onto the Arborway and along present Route 203. Route 3 turned south at Granite Avenue to join the Southeast Expressway in Milton, and Route 3A began southbound at the same location.

With the renumbering, Route 3 was rerouted onto the Southeast Expressway (I-93) into downtown, Route 3A was truncated to its current end in Neponset (although it is technically concurrent with Route 3 between Boston and Burlington), and the former alignment of Routes 3 and 3A were redesignated as Route 203. While the former routes had been signed north–south, the new route was signed east–west to better reflect its actual direction of travel.

In the 1980s, US 1 was removed from its surface alignment in Boston and instead cosigned with I-95 and I-93. As a result, Route 203 no longer terminates at a numbered route at its western end.

Major intersections
The entire route is in Boston, Suffolk County.

References

203
Streets in Boston
Transportation in Suffolk County, Massachusetts